Chot- Aaj Isko, Kal Tereko ( Hurt/wounded, today it was me, tomorrow it will be you) is a Hindi-language action thriller film of Bollywood directed by Nabh Kumar Raju and produced by Sanjay Thakur. This movie was released on 18 June 2004 under the banner of S.M. International. This was the debut film of Indian model turned actress Jesse Randhawa.

Plot 
Over the years, Kishan Yadav came from a remote village to Mumbai. He worked hard day by day and set up a big dairy or Tabela in the city. The workers also love him. Kishan lives with his brother Kabir. One day they were threatened by a promoter and his goons to vacate the land for their business. A corrupt and ruthless police officer Sarad backed the promoter. Kishan went to local police and politician but all in vain. When Kishan declines to vacate the area, the promoter and his goons make their life miserable. Kabir fights back along with a few milkman. A few days latter, Kabir was abducted by Sarad. Sarad tortured him, subsequently, he died. A lady police inspector Malati Desai tried to give them justice, but Kishan became frustrated. Now apparently cool and calm Kishan vows with anger and started to take revenge against Sarad and his associates.

Cast 
 Ashutosh Rana as Kishan Kumar Yadav
 Sharad Kapoor as Police Inspector Sharad
 Rohit Nayyar as Kabir Yadav
 Jesse Randhawa as Kabir's girlfriend
 Nethra Raghuraman as Inspector Malati
 Hemant Mahaur
 Ashok Banthia
 Ganesh Yadav as Goon

Soundtrack
The music of the film was composed by Raju Singh.

References

External links
 

2004 films
2000s Hindi-language films
2004 action thriller films
Indian action thriller films